"I'm Living in Two Worlds" is a song written by Jan Crutchfield, which was recorded and released by American country artist Bonnie Guitar. The song reached number nine on the Billboard Hot Country Singles chart and number ninety-nine on the Billboard Hot 100 in early 1966. "I'm Living in Two Worlds" became Guitar's first Country top-ten single and her first charting single since 1959.  The song was popular among other female country vocalists and covered on albums by Kitty Wells, Loretta Lynn, Wilma Burgess, Skeeter Davis, and Jan Howard.

The single helped officially introduce Guitar to the country music market, setting the trend for a series of country music singles.

Chart performance

References 

1965 singles
Bonnie Guitar songs
1965 songs
Songs written by Jan Crutchfield
Dot Records singles